John Herbert Hatchard (28 January 1917 – 1984) was an association football player who represented New Zealand at international level.

Hatchard made a single appearance in an official international for the All Whites in a 1–7 loss to Australia on 4 July 1936.

References 

1917 births
1984 deaths
New Zealand association footballers
New Zealand international footballers
Association footballers not categorized by position